Dave McLellan (born in Munising, Michigan) was an automotive engineer for General Motors, most notably the chief engineer for the Corvette from 1975 until his retirement in 1992

McLellan joined General Motors in 1959 after graduation from Wayne State University.

He was preceded as Corvette chief engineer by Zora Arkus-Duntov, who he worked briefly with prior to Zora's retirement. He is responsible for creating the C4 Corvette.

He was followed by Dave Hill, who oversaw completion of the 1997 C5 Corvette design that McLellan started.

Dave McLellan had two sons and was married to Glenda McLellan. One son followed in Dave's footsteps becoming an engineer and receiving an education at the Georgia institute of technology.

Dave has also written a well known book about Corvettes.

External links
 Corvette Museum tribute
 Corvette Action Center bio
 Corvette Chief Podcast and Blog
 Personal Bio

People from Munising, Michigan
American automotive engineers
Wayne State University alumni
General Motors former executives
Living people
Year of birth missing (living people)